Diaries 1969–1979: The Python Years, dedicated by Michael Palin to his mother and father, has reduced "mountains to molehills", according to his own words, to take the reader inside the period of the author's life that corresponds to the Monty Python era.
In the introduction we are advised that he started keeping this specific diary (there was an aborted attempt at age 11) in April 1969, at 25 years of age, one month before the Python experience started in full swing.  It started as a means to keep away from smoking, after fellow Python Terry Gilliam accused him of being addicted to cigarettes.  He has continued the diary, written on Ryman's reporter's notepads, for 37 years (up to January 2006).
The first entry on the book-diary corresponds to April 17, 1969, and there is a four-month gap after August 11, 1971, owed, according to the Palin's family folklore, to William's (his second son) stage of "putting things inside other things", in this case the reporter's pad in the trash bin.  The diary is resumed on December 24, 1971, and the last entry corresponds to December 31, 1979.

Even though the interest most people have in Mr. Palin comes from his involvement in Monty Python (and that defines the range of dates for the diary, as we learn that the first day of filming for Monty Python's Flying Circus was Tuesday, July 8), the book mainly takes the reader through the common life of the author, who manages to keep his feet on the ground through the stresses of fame and fortune, and someone whose happy family make his achievements as an entertainer less enviable than his home life.

We travel with him through his job as actor, writer (Monty Python's Flying Circus, Monty Python and the Holy Grail, Monty Python's Life of Brian, Jabberwocky, Ripping Yarns), his growing family (his son Thomas was six months old when the diary begins, and then William and Rachel joined the family), his father's illness and death, his hatred for U.S. president Richard Nixon, and his self search for something else, as if what he had going on was not enough, at least intellectually.  He perceives a novelist inside, but in the diary we never get to actually know what happens to his first novel.

References 
Life of Michael The New York Times Review, December 2, 2007
'Wild, angry and drunk, Graham says what he feels about the various Pythons' The Daily Telegraph Extract October 2, 2006
Ripping yarns? Er, not quite The Observer Review, October 15, 2006
Making sense of crazy times The Spectator Review, November 9, 2006

Diaries
2006 non-fiction books
Weidenfeld & Nicolson books
Books by Michael Palin